The Reinhard and Amelia Schendel House is a historic Queen Anne style house located at 211 North Ludington Street in Columbus, Wisconsin.

Description and history 
The house was built in 1894 for Reinhard Schendel, a Prussian immigrant and lumber dealer, and his wife Amelia. The house includes a tower on one corner and a wraparound porch, both typical features of Queen Anne architecture. The gable ends of the house are covered in decorative wood shingles in various designs; the left gable end features star-shaped shingles around a full moon, the front gable end features shingles shaped like playing card suits, and the right gable end includes more suit-shaped shingles and a variety of other shapes. The Schendel couple lived in the house until Amelia died in 1924. The house is now used for apartments.

On June 7, 2010, the house was added to the National Register of Historic Places.

References

Houses on the National Register of Historic Places in Wisconsin
Queen Anne architecture in Wisconsin
Houses in Columbia County, Wisconsin
Columbus, Wisconsin
National Register of Historic Places in Columbia County, Wisconsin
Houses completed in 1894